Nickelback is a Canadian rock band formed in Hanna, Alberta by Chad Kroeger, Mike Kroeger, Ryan Peake, and then-drummer Brandon Kroeger (who has since been replaced by Daniel Adair). The band has released nine studio albums: Curb (1996), The State (2000), Silver Side Up (2001), The Long Road (2003), All the Right Reasons (2005), Dark Horse (2008), Here and Now (2011), No Fixed Address (2014) and Feed the Machine (2017). Along with this, Nickelback also published two other albums which were a collection of their most well-known songs so far: Three-Sided Coin (2002) and The Best of Nickelback Volume 1 (2013). "How You Remind Me", the first single from the band's third album Silver Side Up, is Nickelback's highest charting single; it peaked at #1 on Billboard'''s Hot 100, Hot Mainstream Rock Tracks, Hot Modern Rock Tracks, and Canadian Hot 100 music charts. The band's fifth studio album, All the Right Reasons, has been their highest-selling album, with over 11 million copies sold worldwide as of late 2007.

Nickelback has been recognized by several Canadian awards ceremonies; the band has received twelve awards from twenty-eight nominations at the Juno Awards and seven awards from fifteen nominations at the MuchMusic Video Awards. Nickelback has also received two awards from six nominations at the American Music Awards and three awards from five nominations at the Billboard Music Awards. The band has received six nominations from the Grammy Awards but has not won any of them. In 2006, Nickelback receive an award at the World Music Awards for World's Best Selling Rock Artist, beating some well-known artists like Green Day, Red Hot Chili Peppers and Coldplay. The group was inducted into Canada's Walk of Fame in 2007. In the same year received an award for People's Choice Awards for the category Favorite Group. Overall, Nickelback has received 32 awards from 78 nominations.

 American Music Awards 
The American Music Awards are awarded for outstanding achievements in the record industry. Nickelback has received two awards from seven nominations.

|-
| 2003 || Nickelback || Favorite Pop/Rock Band/Duo/Group || 
|-
|  || Nickelback || Favorite Pop/Rock Band/Duo/Group || 
|-
|rowspan="3"|  ||rowspan="2"| Nickelback || Favorite Pop/Rock Band/Duo/Group || 
|-
| Favorite Alternative Artist || 
|-
| All the Right Reasons || Favorite Pop/Rock Album || 
|-
|  || Nickelback || Favorite Pop/Rock Band/Duo/Group || 
|-
|  || Nickelback || Favorite Pop/Rock Band/Duo/Group || 

 Billboard Music Awards 
The Billboard Music Awards are sponsored by Billboard magazine and is held annually in December. Nickelback has won seven awards from eleven nominations.

|-
|rowspan="4"| 2002 || rowspan="4" | How You Remind Me || Hot 100 Single of the Year || 
|-
| Hot 100 Airplay Single of the Year || 
|-
| Hot 100 Single of the Year by Duo/Group || 
|-
| Top 40 Rock Track of the Year || 
|-
|rowspan="5"| 2006 ||rowspan="3"| Nickelback || Artist of the Year || 
|-
| Duo/Group of the Year || 
|-
| Hot 100 Artist Duo/Group of the Year || 
|-
|rowspan="2"| All the Right Reasons || Rock Album of the Year || 
|-
| Album of the Year || 
|-
|rowspan="2"| 2012 ||rowspan="2"| Here and Now || Top Rock Album || 
|-
| Top Alternative Album || 

 Grammy Awards 
The Grammy Awards are awarded annually by the National Academy of Recording Arts and Sciences. Nickelback has received six nominations.

|-
|  || "How You Remind Me" || Record of the Year || 
|-
|rowspan="2"|  || "Someday" || Best Rock Song || 
|-
| The Long Road || Best Rock Album || 
|-
|  || "Feelin' Way Too Damn Good" || Best Hard Rock Performance || 
|-
|  || "If Everyone Cared" || Best Rock Performance by a Duo or Group with Vocal || 
|-
|  || "Burn It to the Ground" || Best Hard Rock Performance || 
|}

 Juno Awards 
The Juno Awards are presented by the Canadian Academy of Recording Arts and Sciences. Nickelback has received twelve awards from thirty-three nominations. 

|-
|  || Nickelback || Best New Group || 
|-
|rowspan="4"|  ||rowspan="2"| Silver Side Up || Album of the Year || 
|-
| Rock Album of the Year || 
|-
| "How You Remind Me" || Single of the Year || 
|-
| Nickelback || Group of the Year || 
|-
|rowspan="2"|  || "Hero",  "How You Remind Me" and "Too Bad" || Songwriter of the Year || 
|-
| Nickelback || Juno Fan Choice Award || 
|-
|rowspan="5" |  ||rowspan="2"| The Long Road || Album of the Year || 
|-
| Rock Album of the Year || 
|-
|rowspan="2"| Nickelback || Group of the Year || 
|-
| Juno Fan Choice Award || 
|-
| "Someday" || Single of the Year || 
|-
|  || Nickelback || Jack Richardson Producer of the Year || 
|-
|rowspan="6"|  ||rowspan="2"| All the Right Reasons || Album of the Year || 
|-
| Rock Album of the Year || 
|-
|rowspan="3"| Nickelback || Group of the Year || 
|-
| Jack Richardson Producer of the Year || 
|-
| Juno Fan Choice Award || 
|-
| "Photograph" || Single of the Year || 
|-
|rowspan="2"|  || Nickelback || Juno Fan Choice Award || 
|-
| "Far Away", "If Everyone Cared" and "Rockstar" || Songwriter of the Year || 
|-
|rowspan="5"|  ||rowspan="3"| Nickelback || Group of the Year || 
|-
| Jack Richardson Producer of the Year || 
|-
| Juno Fan Choice Award || 
|-
|"Gotta Be Somebody" || Single of the Year || 
|-
|rowspan="2"| "Dark Horse" || Album of the Year || 
|-
|rowspan="2"|  || Rock Album of the Year || 
|-
||  Nickelback || Juno Fan Choice Award || 
|-
|rowspan="4"|  
|rowspan="2"| Nickelback || Juno Fan Choice || 
|-
| Group of the Year || 
|-
| "Here and Now" || Album of the Year || 
|-
||"When We Stand Together" || Single of the Year || 
|-
|rowspan="1"| 
| Nickelback || Juno Fan Choice || 
|-
|rowspan="4"|  
| No Fixed Address|| Rock Album of the Year || 
|-

Kerrang! Awards
The Kerrang! Awards is an annual awards ceremony held by Kerrang!, a British rock magazine. Nickelback received one nomination.

|-
|rowspan="2"| 2002 || "How You Remind Me" || Best Single || 

 MuchMusic Video Awards 
The MuchMusic Video Awards is an annual awards ceremony presented by the Canadian music video channel MuchMusic. Nickelback received seven awards from sixteen nominations.

|-
| 2000 || "Leader Of Men" || MuchLoud Best Rock Video || 
|-
|rowspan="2"| 2002 ||rowspan="2"| "Too Bad" || Best Video || 
|-
| MuchLoud Best Rock Video || 
|-
| 2006 || "Photograph" || MuchLoud Best Rock Video || 
|-
|rowspan="5"| 2007 ||rowspan="2"| "If Everyone Cared" || Best Video || 
|-
| MuchLoud Best Rock Video || 
|-
|rowspan="3"| "Far Away" || MuchMoreMusic Award || 
|-
| Best International Video by a Canadian || 
|-
| People's Choice: Favourite Canadian Group || 
|-
|rowspan="5"| 2009 ||rowspan="4"| "Gotta Be Somebody" || Video of the Year || 
|-
| Best Post-Production of the Year || 
|-
|MuchLOUD Rock Video of the Year || 
|-
| UR Fave: Canadian Video || 
|-
| "If Today Was Your Last Day" || International Video of the Year by a Canadian || 
|-
|rowspan="2"| 2010 ||rowspan="2"| "I'd Come for You" || Video of the Year || 
|-
|MuchLOUD Rock Video of the Year || 
|-
| | 2012 || "When We Stand Together" || International Video of the Year by a Canadian || 
|-

 MTV Video Music Awards 
The MTV Video Music Awards is an annual awards ceremony presented by the American music video channel MTV. In 2002 Chad Kroeger (Nickelback) has won Best Video from a Film with Josey Scott (Saliva) for 'Spider-Man theme song, "Hero".

|-
| rowspan="2"| 2002 || "Hero" || Best Video from a Film || 
|-
|"Too Bad" || International Viewer's Choice Award for MTV Canada  || 
|}

Nickelodeon Kids Choice Awards 
The Kids Choice Awards is an annual awards ceremony created by Nickelodeon. Nickelback received one nomination.

|-
| 2007 || Nickelback || Favorite Music Group || 
|}

People's Choice Awards
The People's Choice Awards is an awards show recognizing the people and the work of popular culture. Nickelback has received one award, from 2 nomination.

|-
| 2007 || Nickelback || Favorite Group || 
|-
| 2011 || Nickelback || Favorite Rock Band ||

Q Awards
The Q Award is a United Kingdom's annual music awards run by the music magazine Q to honor musical excellence. Winners are voted by readers of Q online, with others decided by a judging panel.

 
|-
| 2002
| "How You Remind Me"
| Best Single 
|

Record of the Year Award
The Record of the Year is an award voted by the UK public. "Rockstar" is the first winner which did not make # 1 on the UK singles chart, and also the first by a non-UK or Irish artist.

|-
| 2008 || Rockstar ||Record of the Year||

References

External links
Official website

Awards
Lists of awards received by Canadian musician
Lists of awards received by musical group